Giusti may refer to:

Giusti (surname)
Armistice of Villa Giusti, armistice that ended warfare between Italy and Austria-Hungary on the Italian Front during World War I
Palazzo Giusti and Garden located in the east of Verona, Italy
Palazzo Giusti, Venice,  Neoclassic-style palace located on the Canal Grande of Venice, Italy
Villa Giusti or Villa Giusti del Giardino, villa in Mandria, outside of Padua in northern Italy

L'ispettore Giusti, 1999 Italian television series